The Devil's Mercy is a 2008 horror-thriller written by James A. McLean and directed by Melanie Orr.

Cast

External links

2008 films
2008 horror films
American horror thriller films
English-language Canadian films
Canadian horror thriller films
2000s English-language films
2000s American films
2000s Canadian films